The 1983 WNBL season (Women's National Basketball League) was the third season of competition since its establishment in 1981. A total of 10 teams contested the league.

Ladder

Finals

1983 WNBL Awards

References

1983
1983 in Australian basketball
Aus
basketball